Megasztár - Voice of the Year was a Hungarian a music talent show that started in 2003 on TV2. While it is widely considered an unlicensed clone of the British television show Pop Idol (and sometimes even referred to as Hungarian Idol), TV2 maintains that it is a distinct format created by SBS management member Christoph Buerge. The sixth season was the last, because TV2 bought the license of The Voice. The Hungarian edition of The Voice premiered in fall 2012; it will be the rival show to X-Faktor.

Impact
The show is notable for not only stirring up but, in the end, radically changing the pop music world in the Hungary of the 2000s, often criticized due to the lack original talent that Megasztár set out to find. As Péter Geszti said during the third season finale, "Hungarian pop musicians are afraid of Megasztár singers because the latter are extruding the former from the pop market."

Indeed, three albums from Megasztár singers already finished in Hungary's official top ten sales list, and by 2005, five of the top ten sellers were Megasztár-related albums.

Show format

Auditions
Auditions for each season are organized in the summer. In these, entrants (the number of whom reached several tens of thousands by season 3) each introduce themselves in front of the jury (already familiar with their application, consisting of a CV and a number of songs given as favourites) with a song either selected by them or the jury, who may either ask them to stop or continue based on their performance.

Semi-finals
From the auditions fifty people are selected, who, in groups of ten, participate in semi-finals in the autumn, singing one song selected by themselves, and with the jury selecting the best two each time to participate in the finals. The jury also has to pick an additional singer each time to participate in a special semi-final, where two more singers are also picked up for the finals, but this time the audience vote for the singers by phone and text messages (and in season 3, via the internet as well).

Finals and elimination
The finals are organized in the spring, where finalists are eliminated one by one, based on the audience's votes. In the inaugural season, the singer with the fewest votes was eliminated. In season 2, the jury chose one singer to continue from the two with the fewest votes. In season 3, the jury chose a singer to continue from the three singers with the fewest votes, the remaining two having to sing a 'duel' for the audience's votes.

Prizes
The grand prize for the winner of the first series of Megasztár was a contract at a record company. Because of the show's high popularity, however, most singers of all editions were given their own contracts in the end. From season 2, winners were also promised a car and a flat in a newly built apartment block, the latter leading to some controversy as the flat which the season 2 winner was promised to have by the end of 2005 was still not built in May 2006.

The jury
Former jury members
Lead jury members were also the show's producers in charge of music.
 Tamás Z. 'Pierrot' Marosi (seasons 1-2)
 Péter Novák (season 3)
 Gyöngyi 'Soma' Spitzer, jazz singer (seasons 1-3)
 Gábor Presser, musician, member of legendary 1970s Hungarian rock group LGT (seasons 1-3 and 5)
 Tibor 'Settenkedő' Bakács, critic (seasons 1-3)
 Barna Pély, jazz musician and singer of the group called United (seasons 1-3)
Enikő Eszenyi, actress (seasons 4-5)
Tamás Mester, singer (seasons 4-6)
Sándor Friderikusz, TV presenter (seasons 4-5)
Miklós Fenyő, singer (seasons 4)

Final jury members
Zoltán Bereczki, actor and singer (season 6)
Mariann Falusi, singer (season 6)
Tamás Mester, singer (seasons 4-6)
Gábor Bochkor, radio personality (season 6)

Finalists
Season 1
 Vera Tóth - winner
 Ibolya Oláh - runner up
 László Gáspár - 3rd place
 Evelyne Kandech - 4th place
 Vera Schmidt - 5th place
 Edmond Géza Nagy - 6th place
 Leslie Szabó - 7th place
 Barbara Schmidt - 8th place
 Henrietta Dér - 9th place
 Zoltán Mujahid - 10th place
 Dorina Galambos - 11th place
 Gergő Aczél - 12th place

Season 2
 Ferenc "Caramel" Molnár - winner
 Tamás Palcsó - runner-up
 Gabi Tóth - 3rd place (younger sister of first series winner Veronika Tóth)
 Dániel Torres - 4th place
 Csaba "Boogie" Gál - 5th place
 Eszter Bartók - 6th place
 Ádám Bálint - 7th place
 Tamás Pál - 8th place
 Levente Bella - 9th place
 Tímea Kovács - 10th place
 Orsolya Pflum - 11th place
 Ivett Kósa - 12th place

Season 3
 Magdolna Rúzsa - winner
 Varga Ferenc - runner-up
 Angéla Póka - 3rd place
 Eszter Szabó - 4th place
 Tamás Kontor - 5th place
 Bíborka Bocskor - 6th place
 Anikó Baktai - 7th place
 Péter Puskás - 8th place
 Mónika Hoffmann - 9th place
 István Varga - 10th place
 Szabolcs Oláh - 11th place
 Izabella Széles - 12th place

Season 4
 Viktor Király - winner
 Dávid Fekete - runner-up
 Krisztián Lakatos - 3rd place
 Lüszi Tóth - 4th place
 Tamara Bencsik - 5th place
 Nguyen Thanh Hien - 6th place
 Károly Szecsődi - 7th place
 Sonia Nkuya - 8th place
 Attila Ásós - 9th place
 Imre Balogh - 10th place

Season 5
 Renáta Tolvai - winner
 Attila Kökény - runner-up
 Melinda Szíj - 3rd place
 András Kállay-Saunders - 4th place
 Djordjevic István "Giorgio" - 5th place
 Yvette Lakatos - 6th place
 Dávid Szeleczki - 7th place
 Anna Patai - 8th place (youngest competitor, age 11)
 Bence Gusztos - 9th place
 Fivérek - 10th place
 Adam's Comedy - 11th place
 Andreas Csonka - 12th place
 Bernadett Varga J. - 13th place

Season 6
 Gigi Radics - winner
 Andrea Szakos - runner-up
 Attila Talán - 3rd place
 Balázs Farkas-Jenser - 4th place
 Benji Burgess - 5th place
 Kristóf "Bozont" Nagy - 6th place
 Adri Nagy - 7th place
 Roland Bihal - 8th place
 Tímea Kullai - 9th place
 István Horváth - 10th place
 Ádám Szűcs - 11th place
 Nóra Réti - 12th place

References

External links
 Official site
 Fan site

Singing talent shows
Hungarian music
TV2 (Hungarian TV channel) original programming